This article lists the main modern pentathlon events and their results for 2019.

International modern pentathlon championships
 July 27 – 30: 2019 Pan American Games in  Lima
 Individual winners:  Charles Fernandez (m) /  Mariana Arceo (f)
 Team Relay winners:  (Duilio Carrillo & Melchor Silva) (m) /  (Samantha Achterberg & Jessica Davis) (f)
 Mixed Team Relay winners:  (Isabella Isaksen & Amro El Geziry)
 Men's Team winners:  (Sergio Villamayor, Leandro Silva, & Emmanuel Zapata)
 Women's Team winners:  (Isabela Abreu, Priscila Oliveira, & Maria Ieda Chaves Guimaraes)
 October 18 – 27: 2019 Military World Games in  Wuhan
 Individual winners:  Alexander Lifanov (m) /  Élodie Clouvel (f)
 Men's Team winners:  (Alexander Lifanov, Ilia Frolov, & Ilya Shugarov)
 Women's Team winners:  (WANG Shiqi, BIAN Yufei, & WANG Wei)

World modern pentathlon championships
 July 7 – 14: 2019 World Junior Modern Pentathlon Championships in  Drzonków
 Junior Individual winners:  Jean-Baptiste Mourcia (m) /  Adelina Ibatullina (f)
 Junior Team Relay winners:  (Sherif Rashad & Mohanad Shaban) (m) /  (Kseniia Fraltsova & Adelina Ibatullina) (f)
 Junior Mixed Team Relay winners:  (Salma Abdelmaksoud & Ahmed Elgendy)
 Junior Men's Team winners:  (Ivan Tarasov, Andrei Zuev, & Sergey Kolbasenko)
 Junior Women's Team winners:  (Adelina Ibatullina, Alena Avdeeva, & Kseniia Fraltsova)
 July 18 – 24: 2019 World Youth Modern Pentathlon Championships (Tetrathlon) in  Sofia
 Youth U19 Individual winners:  Ivan Shalupin (m) /  Kseniya Klimiankova (f)
 Youth U19 Team Relay winners:  (Omar Mohamed & Noureldin Karim) (m) /  (Annika Schneider & Esther Fernandez Donda) (f)
 Youth U19 Mixed Team Relay winners:  (KIM Jae-hak & YOON Yang-ji)
 Youth U19 Men's Team winners:  (Adham Fouda, Noureldin Karim, & Eyad Elkashef)
 Youth U19 Women's Team winners:  (Amina Tagirova, Yana Soloveva, & Iuliia Sergeeva)
 Youth U17 Individual winners:  Moutaz Mohamed (m) /  Svetla Zgurova (f)
 Youth U17 Team Relay winners:  (Abu Bakr Aleadwy & Moutaz Mohamed) (m) /  (Kaede Ohta & Natsu Ohta) (f)
 Youth U17 Mixed Team Relay winners:  (Moutaz Mohamed & Malak Ismail)
 Youth U17 Men's Team winners:  (Kirill Manuilo, Maksim Gorkovenko, & Vladimir Zeleputin)
 Youth U17 Women's Team winners:  (Dorka Sára Tóth, Dorina Dobronyi, & Reka Kozma)
 September 1 – 8: 2019 World Modern Pentathlon Championships in  Budapest
 Individual winners:  Valentin Belaud (m) /  Volha Silkina (f)
 Team Relay winners:  (Patrick Dogue & Alexander Nobis) (m) /  (Mariana Arceo & Mayan Oliver) (f)
 Mixed Team Relay winners:  (Salma Abdelmaksoud & Eslam Hamad)
 Men's Team winners:  (Jun Woong-tae, LEE Ji-hun, & Jung Jin-hwa)
 Women's Team winners:  (Volha Silkina, Anastasiya Prokopenko, & Iryna Prasiantsova)

Continental modern pentathlon championships
 February 21 – 24: 2019 African Modern Pentathlon Championships in  Cairo
 Individual winners:  Sherif Nazeir (m) /  Haydy Morsy (f)
 Men's Team winners:  (Sherif Nazier, Mohanad Shaban, & Sherif Rashad) (default)
 Women's Team winners:  (Haydy Morsy, Kandil Amira, & Aboubakr Sondos) (default)
 June 4 – 9: 2019 European Junior Modern Pentathlon Championships in  Drzonków
 Junior Individual winners:  Andrei Zuev (m) /  Adelina Ibatullina (f)
 Junior Team Relay winners:  (Ivan Khamtsou & Yauheni Arol) (m) /  (Veronika Novotna & Anna Roubickova) (f)
 Junior Mixed Team Relay winners:  (Pele Uibel & Rebecca Langrehr)
 Junior Men's Team winners:  (Jean Baptiste Mourcia, Ugo Fleurot, & Paolo Singh)
 Junior Women's Team winners:  (Adelina Ibatullina, Alena Avdeeva, & Kseniia Fraltsova)
 June 9 – 16: 2019 European Youth Modern Pentathlon Championships (Tetrathlon) in  Kaunas
 Youth Individual winners:  Bence Viczián (m) /  Rita Erdos (f)
 Youth Team Relay winners:  (Giorgio Micheli & Federico Alessandro) (m) /  (Julie Walser & Esther Fernandez Donda) (f)
 Youth Mixed Team Relay winners:  (Vladimir Zabolotskikh & Iuliia Sergeeva)
 Youth Men's Team winners:  (Uladzislau Berazavik, Ilya Kazlou, & Alexei Khurs)
 Youth Women's Team winners:  (Iuliia Sergeeva, Amina Tagirova, & Yana Soloveva)
 August 6 – 11: 2019 European Modern Pentathlon Championships (Olympic Qualification) in  Bath
 Individual winners:  James Cooke (m) /  Laura Asadauskaitė (f)
 Team Relay winners:  (Oliver Murray & Myles Pillage) (m) /  (Ekaterina Khuraskina & Anastasia Petrova) (f)
 Mixed Team Relay winners:  (Kerenza Bryson & Myles Pillage)
 Men's Team winners:  (James Cooke, Thomas Toolis, & Joe Choong)
 Women's Team winners:  (Kate French, Joanna Muir, & Francesca Summers)
 October 7 – 9: 2019 South American Senior & Junior Modern Pentathlon Championships in  Buenos Aires
 Note: The men's team relay results was not done properly.
 Individual winners:  Esteban Bustos (m) /  Ayelen Zapata (f)
 Men's Team winners:  (Vicente Lima, Emmanuel Zapata, & Leandro Corrandini)
 Women's Team winners:  (Isabela Abreu, Stephany Saraiva, & Priscila Oliveira)
 November 11 – 21: 2019 Asia-Oceania Modern Pentathlon Championships in  Kunming
 November 15 – 17: 2019 Pan American Junior & Youth Modern Pentathlon Championships in  Guatemala City
 November 21 – 25: 2019 European U24 Modern Pentathlon Championships in  Drzonków
 November 28 – December 1: 2019 South American Youth Modern Pentathlon Championships (Tetrathlon) in  Montevideo

2019 Modern Pentathlon World Cup
 February 27 – March 3: MPWC #1 in  Cairo
 Individual winners:  Ahmed El-Gendy (m) /  Uliana Batashova (f)
 Mixed Team Relay winners:  (Haydy Morsy & Ahmed El-Gendy)
 April 10 – 14: MPWC #2 in  Sofia
 Individual winners:  Manuel Padilla (m) /  Marie Oteiza (f)
 Mixed Team Relay winners:  (Marta Kobecka & Jaroslaw Swiderski)
 May 2 – 6: MPWC #3 in  Székesfehérvár
 Individual winners:  Christian Zillekens (m) /  Tamara Alekszejev (f)
 Mixed Team Relay winners:  (BIAN Yufei & HAN Jiahao)
 May 22 – 27: MPWC #4 in  Prague
 Individual winners:  Aleksander Lesun (m) /  Kate French (f)
 Mixed Team Relay winners:  (Joanna Muir & Samuel Curry)
 June 27 – 30: MPWC #5 (final) in  Tokyo
 Individual winners:  Joe Choong (m) /  Laura Asadauskaitė (f)
 Mixed Team Relay winners:  (Valentin Prades & Élodie Clouvel)

References

External links
 Union Internationale de Pentathlon Moderne Website (UIPM)

 
Modern pentathlon
2019 in sports
2019 sport-related lists